Townsville East was an electoral district of the Legislative Assembly in the Australian state of Queensland from 1986 to 1992.

It was formed from the areas of the abolished districts of Townsville West and Townsville South.

The district was abolished in the 1991 redistribution, and its territory was absorbed into the new district of Mundingburra and the existing district of Burdekin.

Members for Townsville East

Election results

See also
 Electoral districts of Queensland
 Members of the Queensland Legislative Assembly by year
 :Category:Members of the Queensland Legislative Assembly by name

References

Former electoral districts of Queensland